Austin Krajicek and Tennys Sandgren were the defending champions but chose not to defend their title.

Leander Paes and Purav Raja won the title after defeating Ruan Roelofse and Joe Salisbury 6–3, 6–7(5–7), [10–5] in the final.

Seeds

Draw

References
 Main Draw
 Qualifying Draw

JSM Challenger of Champaign-Urbana - Doubles
2017 Doubles